Eregla Panodchi is a Tulu language film directed by Kodlu Ramakrishna starring Sandeep Shetty, Shivadhwaj, Neethu, Raksha Shenoy, Anitha Bhat, Ila Vitla, Shobha Rai, Bhojaraj Vamanjoor, Aravind Bolar, Sundar Rai Mandara, Ravi Surathkal, Pradeep Alva, Roopa Varkadi, Kavitha Rai, Shashidhar Bellaya, Tamma Lakshmana, Rajgopal Josh and others.  Eregla Panodchi is jointly produced under the banner of   Kodlu Creations by B.L. Murali and S.K. Shetty . This is 25th film directed by Kodlu Ramakrishna, who directed Kannada and Tulu movies too. The movie is a remake of director's own 1994 Kannada movie Yarigu Helbedi.This is the second remake in Tulu movies after Shutterdulai''.

Plot
Eregla Panodchi is the story of housewives living in rented row houses called as Vatara, who have strong urge to own their own houses. But their husbands being lazy, continue to be indifferent to their desire. At this juncture there enters a social worker in the vatara who nurtures the ambitions of these housewives to own a house.

Cast
 Sandeep Shetty
 Shivadhwaj
 Neethu
 Anitha Bhat
 Ila Vitla
 Raksha Shenoy
 Shobha Rai
 Bhojaraj Vamanjoor
 Aravind Bolar
 Sundar Rai Mandara
 Ravi Surathkal
 Pradeep Alva
 Roopa Varkadi
 Kavitha Rai
 Shashidhar Bellaya
 Tamma Lakshmana
 Rajgopal Josh

Soundtrack
The soundtracks of the film were composed by  Giridhar Dhiwan and released at  Shambavi Hotel, Udupi on Sunday 11 October 2015

See also
List of Tulu films of 2015
List of Tulu films of 2014
List of Released Tulu films
Tulu cinema
 Tulu Movie Actors
 Tulu Movie Actresses

References

External links

Films directed by Kodlu Ramakrishna